Jay C. Shambaugh is an American academic and economist who has served as under secretary of the treasury for international affairs since January 2023.

Education 
Shambaugh earned a Bachelor of Arts degree from Yale University, a Master of Arts from Tufts University, and a PhD from the University of California, Berkeley.

Career 
Shambaugh has worked as an instructor at Dartmouth College and Georgetown University. He was also a visiting scholar at the International Monetary Fund. He is a research associate at the National Bureau of Economic Research and was a senior fellow at the Brookings Institution. From 2015 to 2017, Shambaugh was a staff economist on the Council of Economic Advisers. He has since worked as a professor of economics and international affairs at the George Washington University and director of the Institute for International Economic Policy. Shambaugh has appeared as a guest on NPR, where he has provided commentary on economic policy related to gig work.

In February 2022, Shambaugh was nominated to serve as under secretary of the treasury for international affairs. He was confirmed by the United States Senate on December 13, 2022 by a vote of 70–27,  and he was sworn in by Secretary Janet Yellen on January 13, 2023.

References 

Living people
American economists
Yale University alumni
Tufts University alumni
University of California, Berkeley alumni
Dartmouth College faculty
Georgetown University faculty
George Washington University faculty
International Monetary Fund people
Brookings Institution people
Obama administration personnel
Biden administration personnel
Year of birth missing (living people)